Nereiospora is a genus of fungi in the family Halosphaeriaceae. The genus contains two species.

References

Sordariomycetes genera
Microascales